Stegolepis is a group of plants in the family Rapateaceae described as a genus in 1872 .

The genus is endemic to northeastern South America, primarily southern Venezuela.

 Species

References

Poales genera
Rapateaceae
Flora of northern South America
Guayana Highlands